Dužine is a village in Serbia. It is situated in the Plandište municipality, in the South Banat District, Vojvodina province. The village has a Serb ethnic majority (54,33%) with a present Macedonian (31,05%) and Slovenian (8,21%) minority. Its population numbering 219 people (2002 census). There is also an officially recognized Macedonian minority population living in Dužine.

Name
In Serbian the village is known as Dužine / Дужине (formerly also Sečenovo / Сеченово), in Macedonian as Дужине, in Hungarian as Szécsenfalva, and in German as Setschanfeld.

Historical population

1961: 623
1971: 400
1981: 282
1991: 234
2002: 219

References
Slobodan Ćurčić, Broj stanovnika Vojvodine, Novi Sad, 1996.

See also
List of places in Serbia
List of cities, towns and villages in Vojvodina

Populated places in South Banat District
Populated places in Serbian Banat
Plandište
Macedonian communities in Serbia